Tourville and Murat Bays Important Bird Area is an important bird area in South Australia with a combined area of , located west to the town of Ceduna on the north-west corner of the Eyre Peninsula  in the Great Australian Bight.  It is considered to be an important area because of the resident populations of waders, or shorebirds.

Description
The Important Bird Area (IBA) consists of two separate areas - one on the west side of Murat Bay and the other covering the full extent of Tourville Bay. Both bays open to Denial Bay which itself is bounded by St Peter Island, a member of the Nuyts Archipelago, on its east side. Tourville Bay has a relatively narrow neck and contains extensive intertidal flats and saltmarsh. Murat Bay is more open to the sea. The important bird area includes the intertidal zone and extends inland to take in other coastal features such as wetlands, including mangroves and playa lakes.

Criteria for nomination as an IBA
The bays have been identified as an IBA by BirdLife International because, together, they support over 1% of the world populations of both pied and sooty oystercatchers.  Other birds for which the site is important include common greenshanks, red knots, sharp-tailed sandpipers, banded lapwings, red-capped plovers and fairy terns.  There are also records of hooded plovers, pied and great cormorants, and white-faced herons.  rock parrots inhabit the saltmarsh.

Associated protected areas
While the IBA has no statutory status, it does overlap part of the Nuyts Archipelago Marine Park, a marine protected area declared by the Government of South Australia.

See also
List of birds of South Australia
Murat (disambiguation)

References

Important Bird Areas of South Australia
Eyre Peninsula